Bouyer Creek is a stream in St. Francois County in the U.S. state of Missouri. It is a tributary of the Terre Bleue Creek.

A variant name was "Boyers Run". The creek has the name of Boyer, a pioneer citizen.

See also
List of rivers of Missouri

References

Rivers of St. Francois County, Missouri
Rivers of Missouri